A phonogram is a grapheme (written character) which represents a phoneme (speech sound) or combination of phonemes, such as the letters of the Latin alphabet or Korean letter Hangul. For example, "igh" is an English-language phonogram that represents the  sound in "high". Whereas the word phonemes refers to the sounds, the word phonogram refers to the letter(s) that represent that sound. 

Phonograms contrast with logograms, which represent words and morphemes (meaningful units of language), and determinatives, silent characters used to mark semantic categories.

See also 

 Emoji
 Logo
 Symbol
 Syllabogram
 Wingdings
 Rebus, the use of pictures to represent words or parts of words

External links 
 古代文字資料館　Ancient Writing Library

Graphemes
Linguistics terminology